Sajad Sattari (Standard Persian pronunciation: ; born Sajad Sattari Nejad; 19 August 2001 in Karaj) is an Iranian Muay Thai Kickboxer. He is current WBC Muay Thai welterweight world champion. Sattari ranked #10 in the WMO welterweight rankings.

Muay Thai career 
Sattari has won two championships and a runner-up title in the IFMA Youth world championships from 2016 to 2018.

In 2017, he won a silver medal at EMF Open Cup. In 2018, in addition to winning a gold medal, he was recognized as the best technical fighter in youth category.

In May 2022, Sattari became the first Iranian to win the WBC Muay Thai world championship.

Championships and awards 

International Federation of Muaythai Associations
  2016 IFMA Youth World Muay Thai Championship
  2017 IFMA Youth World Muay Thai Championship
  2018 IFMA Youth World Muay Thai Championship
 EMF Open Cup
  2017 EMF Open Cup
  2018 EMF Open Cup (The best technical fighter in youth category)
 World Boxing Council Muaythai
 2022 WBC Muay Thai -66.7 kg World Championship

Muay Thai record 

|-  style="background:#cfc"
| 2023-03-04||Win ||align=left| Kong Sambo  || Rajadamnern World Series || Bangkok, Thailand || KO (Elbow)|| 2 ||2:34
|- style="background:#fbb" 
| 2022-12-16 || Loss ||align="left" | Yodkhunpon MoothongAcademy || Rajadamnern World Series  || Bangkok, Thailand || Decision (Split)|| 3 || 3:00
|- style="background:#cfc" 
| 2022-11-04 || Win ||align="left" | Kratudtorn Sor.Yansri || Rajadamnern World Series || Bangkok, Thailand || Decision (Unanimous) || 3||3:00
|- style="background:#c5d2ea" 
| 2022-09-30 || Draw ||align="left" | Shadow Singmawynn || Rajadamnern World Series - Group Stage || Bangkok, Thailand || Decision (Majority) || 3 || 3:00 
|- style="background:#cfc" 
| 2022-08-26 || Win ||align="left" | Jonny Betts || Rajadamnern World Series - Group Stage || Bangkok, Thailand || KO ||  1|| 1:32
|- style="background:#fbb"
| 2022-07-22 ||Loss||align="left" | Mungkornkaw Sitkaewprapon  || Rajadamnern World Series - Group Stage || Bangkok, Thailand || Decision || 3 || 3:00
|- style="background:#cfc" 
| 2022-05-14 ||Win||align=left| Julio Lobo || Venum Fight, Rajadamnern Stadium || Bangkok, Thailand || Decision || 5 || 3:00
|-
! style=background:white colspan=9 |
|-
|- style="background:#cfc" 
| 2022-03-26 ||Win||align=left| Sritrang Tor.Buamas  ||FighterX  || Hua Hin, Thailand || TKO || 3 || N/A
|-
|- style="background:#cfc" 
| 2022-03-05 ||Win||align=left| Jaroenporn Jpowerroofphuket  ||FighterX  || Hua Hin, Thailand || TKO || 5 || N/A
|-
|- style="background:#cfc" 
| 2022-01-28 ||Win||align=left| RakThai Kiatchatchai || Muay Mun Wun Suk || Bangkok, Thailand || TKO (Low kick) || 3 || N/A
|-
|- style="background:#cfc" 
| 2021-12-25 ||Win||align=left| Jomhod Petch.Por.Tor.Or  || Muay Hardcore || Phuket, Thailand || TKO  || 1 || N/A
|-
|- style="background:#cfc" 
| 2021-12-03 ||Win||align=left| Jack Apichat || Suek Petchyindee, Rangsit Stadium || Bangkok, Thailand || TKO (Elbow) || 3 || N/A
|-
|- style="background:#fbb" 
| 2021-10-28 ||Loss||align=left| Jack Apichat || Suek Petchyindee, Rangsit Stadium || Buriram, Thailand || Decision || 5 || 3:00
|-
|- style="background:#fbb" 
| 2021-04-03 ||Loss||align=left| Kongklai AnnyMuayThai || Thai Fight: Nan || Nan, Thailand || TKO (Punches)|| 2 || N/A
|-
|- style="background:#fbb" 
| 2020-12-06 ||Loss||align=left| Sueablack PinyoMuayThai  || Super Champ Muay Thai || Bangkok, Thailand || Decision || 3 || 3:00

|- style="background:#cfc" 
| 2020-11-01 ||Win||align=left| Petchsamui Lukjaoporongtom  || Super Champ Muay Thai || Bangkok, Thailand || Decision || 3 || 3:00

|- style="background:#fbb" 
| 2020-01-19 ||Loss||align=left| Rastchasing KoratSportSchool  || Super Champ Muay Thai || Bangkok, Thailand || Decision || 3 || 3:00
|-

|- style="background:#cfc" 
| 2019-12-08 ||Win||align=left| Sumaei Phetkasem || Super Champ Muay Thai || Bangkok, Thailand || Decision || 3 || 3:00

|- style="background:#fbb" 
| 2019-11-23 ||Loss||align=left| Long Samnang || CNC Boxing || Cambodia || Decision || 5 || 3:00

|- style="background:#cfc" 
| 2019-11-02 ||Win||align=left| F16 Sor.Sophit || Muay Hardcore || Bangkok, Thailand || KO (Punch)|| 2 || 2:10

|- style="background:#fbb" 
| 2019-09-21 ||Loss||align=left| Long Samnang || CNC Boxing || Cambodia || Decision (Split)|| 5 || 3:00

|- style="background:#cfc" 
| 2019-09-06 ||Win||align=left| Li Lianbang || Wu Lin Feng 2019: WLF at Lumpinee - China vs Thailand || Bangkok, Thailand || Decision || 3 || 3:00
|-
|- style="background:#cfc" 
| 2019-08-25 ||Win||align=left| Petchtongkam Bangkokalaiyon || Super Champ Muay Thai || Bangkok, Thailand || KO (Elbow)|| 2 || 2:25

|- style="background:#cfc" 
| 2019-07-27 ||Win||align=left| Elit Pheakdeyn || CNC Boxing || Cambodia || Decision|| 5 || 3:00
|-
| colspan=9 | Legend:    

|- style="background:#fbb;"
|2018-08-08
|Loss
| align="left" | Roman Rojak
|2018 IFMA Youth World Championship, Final
|Bangkok, Thailand
|Decision (0-0)
|3
|3:00
|-
|-
! style=background:white colspan=9 |
|- style="background:white"
|- style="background:#cfc;"
|2018-08-07
|Win
| align="left" | Enes Koz
|2018 IFMA Youth World Championship, Semi Final
|Bangkok, Thailand
|Decision (29-28)
|3
|3:00
|-
|- style="background:#cfc;"
|2018-08-05
|Win
| align="left" | Ion Ungurean
|2018 IFMA Youth World Championship, Quarter Final
|Bangkok, Thailand
|Decision (30-27)
|3
|3:00
|-
|- style="background:#cfc;"
|2018-08-05
|Win
| align="left" | Jonathan ONeill
|2018 IFMA Youth World Championship, 1/8 Final
|Bangkok, Thailand
|Decision (30-27)
|3
|3:00
|-
|- style="background:#cfc;"
|2017-08-03
|Win
| align="left" | Mehmet Harun Erturk
|2017 IFMA Youth World Championship, Final
|Bangkok, Thailand
|Decision (29-28)
|3
|3:00
|-
|-
! style=background:white colspan=9 |
|- style="background:white"
|- style="background:#cfc;"
|2017-08-03
|Win
| align="left" | Kvach Danila
|2017 IFMA Youth World Championship, Semi Final
|Bangkok, Thailand
|Decision (30-27)
|3
|3:00
|- style="background:#cfc;"
|2017-08-03
|Win
| align="left" | Mateusz Matczak
|2017 IFMA Youth World Championship, Quarter Final
|Bangkok, Thailand
|Forfeit (30-27)
|3
|3:00
|-
| colspan=9 | Legend:

See also 

 List of WBC Muaythai world champions
 List of Muay Thai practitioners
 List of male kickboxers
 Venum

References

External links 

 Sajad Satari at IFMA
 

2001 births
Living people
People from Karaj
Iranian male kickboxers
Iranian Muay Thai practitioners
21st-century Iranian people